Patrick Joseph Sullivan (January 18, 1950 – December 1, 2019) was an American professional football player and college coach.  An All-America quarterback for the Auburn Tigers, he won the Heisman Trophy in 1971 and then played six seasons in the National Football League  (NFL) with the Atlanta Falcons and Washington Redskins.  Sullivan was a head football coach at Samford University, a position he held from 2007 to 2014.  He was previously the head football coach at Texas Christian University (TCU) from 1992 to 1997 and the offensive coordinator at the University of Alabama at Birmingham (UAB) from 1999 to 2006.  Sullivan was inducted into the College Football Hall of Fame as a player in 1991.

College career
Born in Birmingham, Alabama, Sullivan began his athletic career as a three-sport star at Birmingham's John Carroll Catholic High School. Although a talented baseball and basketball player, he chose to play football for Auburn University where he would become the starting quarterback in 1969 under the tutelage of head coach Ralph Jordan. In 1970, he led the NCAA in total offense with 2,856 yards and set an NCAA record for most yards per play with 8.57. In his career, he was responsible for 72 touchdowns (54 passing/18 rushing) to tie the NCAA record. In his senior season, Sullivan completed 162 passes on 281 attempts for 2,012 yards and 20 touchdowns. This performance was enough to edge out Ed Marinaro for the 1971 Heisman Trophy. Also an excellent student, Sullivan was named an Academic All-American and graduated with a Bachelor of Science in business administration in 1972. Sullivan finished his college career with 6,284 passing yards and 54 touchdowns, along with another 18 touchdowns on the ground. He was selected to play in the Senior Bowl, where he led the South to victory over the North and was given the game's Most Valuable Player award.

Professional career
After college, Sullivan had a six-season professional NFL football career. He was a second-round selection (40th overall pick) of the 1972 NFL Draft by the Atlanta Falcons. Sullivan played with the Falcons from 1972 to 1975. He played in 30 games. In 1974, Sullivan started three games for the Atlanta Falcons, losing all three. He completed 48 of 105 passes and one touchdown. In 1975, he threw for 3 touchdowns, completing 28 of 70 passes. He signed with the Washington Redskins as a free agent in 1976 but was cut before the start of the season.  He signed with the Chicago Bears in March 1977 but was sold to the San Francisco 49ers in June, and then cut by the 49ers before the start of the 1977 season.  Sullivan left football to enter private business in Birmingham, where he worked in insurance and as a tire company executive.

Coaching career
Sullivan spent five seasons doing radio color commentary for Auburn football games before joining the staff at Auburn in 1986 as quarterbacks coach under head coach Pat Dye. He worked with Auburn quarterbacks Jeff Burger, Reggie Slack, and Stan White during his six years at Auburn. During his time as an assistant Auburn won, or shared, three Southeastern Conference championships and had a four-game winning streak against archrival Alabama.

On January 2, 1992, Sullivan became the 27th head football coach of Texas Christian University. He inherited a team still reeling from probation imposed by the NCAA in 1986. Most seriously, the Frogs had been limited to 25 scholarships in 1987 and 1988. By the time Sullivan arrived in Fort Worth, the sanctions had taken their full effect; TCU would not have a full complement of scholarships until 1993.

After two losing seasons, he led TCU to a 7–5 mark in 1994 to win a share of the Southwest Conference championship, the school's first SWC title since 1959. Following the 1994 season, prior to the Horned Frogs' appearance in the Independence Bowl versus Virginia, Sullivan agreed to become the head coach at Louisiana State University (LSU). However, LSU refused to pay the $400,000 buyout of Sullivan's TCU contract, and the Tigers hired Vanderbilt University coach Gerry DiNardo three days later.

The next season produced another winning record of 6–5 before TCU joined the Western Athletic Conference in 1996 and fell once again on hard times. Losing seasons in 1996 and 1997 resulted in Sullivan's resignation in October 1997 with an overall record of 24–42–1. However, he is best known for having recruited LaDainian Tomlinson to play at TCU.

In January 1999, Sullivan became the offensive coordinator and quarterbacks coach of UAB. He helped develop Darrell Hackney into the best quarterback in UAB history who was able to make it to the NFL as an undrafted free agent picked up by the Cleveland Browns. UAB's offense also featured wide receiver Roddy White, who later played for the Atlanta Falcons.

After neck surgery in September 2003, Sullivan was diagnosed with throat cancer by Dr. William R. Carroll (squamous cell carcinoma) and began chemotherapy and radiation treatments in December. In April 2004, doctors told him he was clear of cancer, but he continued to be monitored for recurrence. Sullivan missed only one game coaching in the 2003 season due to treatment, but lost around 50 pounds over the course of his cancer treatment.

On December 1, 2006, Sullivan was named head coach at Samford University, replacing Bill Gray. In 2008, the Bulldogs joined the Southern Conference and won the championship in 2013. He resigned after the 2014 season, his eighth season as coach.

Personal life
Sullivan was married to the former Jean Hicks of Birmingham and they had three children – Kim, and twins Kelly and Patrick, Jr.

Death 
Pat Sullivan died on December 1, 2019 after a long battle with cancer. On January 1, 2020, Auburn players wore "7" decals on the left side of their helmets during the Outback Bowl to commemorate Sullivan.

Honors and awards
Sullivan was selected to the Alabama Sports Hall of Fame, class of 1981. In 1988, he was also a charter member of the Senior Bowl Hall of Fame. The football field house at Samford University was renamed in his honor. In 2016, Sullivan's High School Alma Mater renamed the John Carroll High School Football Field in honor of Pat Sullivan.   

 Omicron Delta Kappa, 1971
Heisman Trophy, 1971
 Chic Harley Award
 Sammy Baugh Trophy, 1970
 Walter Camp Award, 1971
 SN Player of the Year, 1971
 All-American, 1970, 1971 (unanimous)
 SEC Player of the Year, 1970
 SEC Back of the Year-Birmingham Touchdown Club, 1970
 SEC Back of the Year-Atlanta Touchdown Club, 1970
 Gator Bowl Most Valuable Player, 1970
 Sugar Bowl Most Valuable Player, 1971
 Senior Bowl Most Valuable Player, 1972
 College All-Star Game Most Valuable Player, 1972
 Alabama Sports Hall of Fame
 National Football Foundation Hall of Fame
 Sugar Bowl Hall of Fame
 Gator Bowl Hall of Fame
 Senior Bowl Hall of Fame
 College Football Hall of Fame, 1991
 Southwest Conference Coach of the Year, 1994
 Southern Conference Co-Coach of the Year, 2012

Head coaching record

See also
 List of NCAA major college football yearly total offense leaders

References

External links
 
 
 

1950 births
2019 deaths
American football quarterbacks
Atlanta Falcons players
Auburn Tigers football announcers
Auburn Tigers football coaches
Auburn Tigers football players
Burials at Elmwood Cemetery (Birmingham, Alabama)
Samford Bulldogs football coaches
TCU Horned Frogs football coaches
UAB Blazers football coaches
All-American college football players
College Football Hall of Fame inductees
Heisman Trophy winners
Coaches of American football from Alabama
Players of American football from Birmingham, Alabama